The Abkhazian Air Force is a small air force, which is a part of the Abkhazian Armed Forces, operating from Abkhazia.

History 
Few details are available on its formation, but it is reported to have been established by Viyacheslav Eshba based upon several Yak-52 trainer aircraft armed with machine guns.  Its first combat mission was conducted on 27 August 1992, which has come to be celebrated in Abkhazia as "Aviation Day."  The Abkhaz Air Force claims to have made 400 operational flights during the 1992-1993 Abkhaz-Georgian war.  Abkhaz combat losses during the civil war are uncertain, but include a Yak-52 on a reconnaissance mission near Sukhumi on 4 July 1993.

In the autumn of 2001, Abkhazia's air force was reported to comprise 250 personnel,  1 Su-25, 2 L-39, 1 Yak-52, and 2 Mi-8. The display of three L-39s at a parade in 2004 suggests a possible recent acquisition.  In February 2007 a Russian website reported that Abkhazia has 2 Su-27 fighters,  1 Yak-52, 2 Su-25 attack aircraft, 2 L-39 combat trainers, 1 An-2 light transport, 7 Mi-8 helicopters and 3 Mi-24 helicopters. However, an undated 2007 Abkhaz source gave the inventory for the Abkhazian Air Force as 16 MiG-21, 46 Su-25, 2 L-39, 1 Yak-52, and 2 Mi-8.  In March 2008, a military aviation enthusiast website repeated this inventory but added 9 Mi-24/35 attack helicopters. In 2021, President Aslan Bzhania announced intentions to modernize the air force.

Equipment 
An accounting of exact types, quantities, and service dates for aircraft serving in the Abkhazian Air Force is difficult to accurately provide due to a number of factors including Abkhazia's disputed status, a lack of official available information, multiple conflicts over the course of its existence, and the regular involvement of Russian aircraft and pilots in the conflicts and region.  In general, the air force has relied on aircraft inherited from the former Soviet forces based in Abkhazia with possible reinforcement in recent years by Russia with second-hand aircraft.  No traditional contracts for aircraft purchases by Abkhazia have been reported.

Aircraft

References

Military units and formations established in 1992
Air forces by country
Military of Abkhazia
Military aviation in Asia